Uri Bar-Ner is a senior adviser to the President of the America-Israel Friendship League, the former Israeli ambassador to Turkey from 1998–2001, and he served as Israeli Consul General in Chicago and Deputy Consul General in New York City, USA.  Bar-Ner was the deputy Director General of the Israeli Ministry of Foreign Affairs and served in diplomatic missions in Europe and Asia.  He has a Bachelor of Arts from Hebrew University of Jerusalem and a Master of Arts in political science from Emory University.

Bar-Ner has been active in promoting Israel through the AIFL.  Specifically, he helped to mitigate a disinvestment campaign by the Presbyterian church; Bar-Ner arranged a trip through AIFL for priests and senior clergy, after which the church abolished the resolution calling for divestment.

References

External links
A message from the ambassador of Israel to Turkey H.E. Mr. Uri Bar-Ner at Turkish Daily News

Israeli civil servants
Living people
20th-century Polish Jews
Ambassadors of Israel to Turkey
Hebrew University of Jerusalem alumni
Year of birth missing (living people)
Israeli consuls
Emory University alumni